Conrad Keith Nightingale  (born September 24, 1945, in Colorado Springs, Colorado) is an American steeplechase runner who competed in the 1968 Summer Olympics.

References

1945 births
Living people
Sportspeople from Colorado Springs, Colorado
Track and field athletes from Colorado
American male steeplechase runners
Olympic track and field athletes of the United States
Athletes (track and field) at the 1968 Summer Olympics
Pan American Games medalists in athletics (track and field)
Pan American Games silver medalists for the United States
Athletes (track and field) at the 1967 Pan American Games
Medalists at the 1967 Pan American Games